Ami Shelef (עמי שלף; September 20, 1936 - December 24, 1988) was an Israeli basketball player and coach. He played the center position. He played in the Israel Basketball Premier League, and for the Israeli national basketball team.

Biography
Shelef was born in Haifa, Palestine, and was 1.96 m (6 ft 5 in) tall.

He played in the Israel Basketball Premier League for Hapoel Givat Brenner and Hapoel Tel Aviv.

Shelef competed for the Israeli national basketball team. He played in the 1961 European Championship for Men, 1963 European Championship for Men, 1965 European Championship for Men, and 1966 Asian Games Basketball Championship (winning a gold medal).

Later, Shelef was a physical education teacher in Be'er Sheva, and coached Hapoel Petah Tikva and Hapoel Tel Aviv. His sons Uri Shelef and Gur Shelef also played in the Israel Basketball Premier League, and for the Israeli national basketball team.

He died of cancer at 52 years of age.

References 

1936 births
1988 deaths
Sportspeople from Haifa
Mandatory Palestine sportspeople
Israeli men's basketball players
Hapoel Tel Aviv B.C. players
Hapoel Tel Aviv B.C. coaches
Israeli basketball coaches
Israeli Basketball Premier League players
Deaths from cancer in Israel
Jews in Mandatory Palestine
Asian Games medalists in basketball
Basketball players at the 1966 Asian Games
Asian Games gold medalists for Israel
Medalists at the 1966 Asian Games